Mount Hesperus is the highest peak of the Revelation Mountains, the westernmost subrange of the Alaska Range. The Revelations are a small, rarely visited range, but they contain dramatic rock peaks, rising from low bases. Mount Hesperus is particularly impressive in terms of local relief: for example, it drops over 7,500 feet (2,286m) in less than 2 miles (3,219m) on two sides. Such steepness for this amount of relief makes Hesperus comparable to the best peaks in North America.

Mount Hesperus lies to the north of most of the other peaks of the Revelation Mountains, between two forks of the Big River. To the southwest of the peak lies the Revelation Glacier.
The peak is over 100 miles from the closest significant airport.

The first ascent of Mount Hesperus was on May 2, 1985, by Justin Lesueur (New Zealand) and Karl Swanson, Stephen Spalding (Alaska). They first attempted routes on the northeast side of the peak, and then successfully ascended a route on the southwest face, which involved snow climbing, some rock bands, a frozen waterfall, and an icy, corniced ridge.


See also

List of mountain peaks of North America
List of mountain peaks of the United States
List of mountain peaks of Alaska
List of Ultras of the United States

References

Sources
 Stephen Spaulding, "Hesperus", American Alpine Journal 60 (Vol. 28), 1986.

External links

 Mount Hesperus on Topozone

Alaska Range
Landforms of Bethel Census Area, Alaska
Mountains of Alaska
Mountains of Unorganized Borough, Alaska